Hakon is the Danish spelling of the Norwegian name Håkon or Haakon. The name is also related to the Danish form Hagen (given name) and Hagen (surname).

Those with the name include:
 Hakon Sunnivasson (1131), Danish nobleman and the father of Eric III of Denmark
 Hakon Andersen (1875-1959), Danish organist and composer for organ
 Hakon Børresen (1876-1954), Danish composer

See also
 Hakon Jarl runestones, stones from around the 12th century found in Denmark with two inscribed mentioning a "jarl" (earl) named Hakon
 Hakone, a town in Japan

References

Danish masculine given names